The 2018 Canadian American Association of Professional Baseball season began on May 17, 2018, and ended on September 3, 2018. It was the league's 14th season of operations. Following the regular season, the playoffs were held. The Sussex County Miners defeated the reigning-champion Quebec Capitales in the fourth and deciding game, played on September 15.

Season summary 

While the Dominican Republic National team toured during the regular season, there were two additional traveling teams that played all six of the Can-Am League teams; the Salina Stockade and the Hollywood Stars. The Stars played nine games, finishing 1-8, and the Stockade played 18 games, finishing 3-15.

Standings

* Teams not eligible for playoffs

Playoffs

Semifinals

Sussex County vs. Trois-Rivières

Quebec vs. Rockland

Championship

Sussex County vs. Quebec

Attendance

References

External links
Can-Am League website

Canadian American Association of Professional Baseball
Canam
Canam
Canam